Ruicheng County is under the administration of the Yuncheng City, in the southwest of Shanxi province, China. It is the southernmost county-level division of Shanxi, with the Yellow River demarcating its border with the provinces of Henan to the south and Shaanxi to the west. The population as of the 2020 census is around 350,000.

Ruicheng is home to Yongle Gong, a Taoist temple complex noted for the wall paintings inside its three main halls. It was moved to Ruicheng in 1959 to preserve it when the Sanmenxia Dam was built, which was expected to put the town of Yongle, the previous location of the temple, under water. The temple is 4 km north of the town centre. The city is also known for its City God Temple and Guangrenwang Temple, the latter of which is the second oldest extant building in China.

The Yellow River lies just south of Ruicheng, and Dayudu (Yu the Great's Crossing) along the river bank is a notable scenic spot. A pumping station on the river doubles as a monument to Yu the Great, the legendary figure credited with controlling the course of the Yellow River and saving many lives in the process.

Administrative divisions
Fenglingdu town

Climate

Agriculture
Apples are to be found in abundance in Ruicheng, being the most popular variety of fruit grown by local farmers.

References

External links 
 http://www.rcx.gov.cn/

County-level divisions of Shanxi